Purevjavyn Unurbat (born 15 February 1988) is a Mongolian freestyle wrestler. He competed in the freestyle 74 kg event at the 2012 Summer Olympics and was eliminated by Davit Khutsishvili in the qualifications.  At the 2016 Olympics, he lost to Soner Demirtaş in his first match.

At the 2015 World Championships, he won the silver medal despite being unranked entering the championship.  He beat Gong Byungman in the first round, Cristian Jose Sarco in the second, Zelimkhan Khadjiev in the quarterfinal and Narsingh Pancham Yadav in the semifinal before losing to Jordan Burroughs in the final.  It was Burroughs's fourth world title, and Önörbat lost to a technical fall.

References

External links
 

1988 births
Living people
Mongolian male sport wrestlers
Olympic wrestlers of Mongolia
Wrestlers at the 2012 Summer Olympics
Wrestlers at the 2016 Summer Olympics
Wrestlers at the 2010 Asian Games
People from Darkhan-Uul Province
World Wrestling Championships medalists
Asian Games competitors for Mongolia
Asian Wrestling Championships medalists
21st-century Mongolian people